Attenborough may refer to:

People
 David Attenborough (b. 1926), English broadcaster and naturalist
 Attenborough (surname)

Places
 Attenborough, Nottinghamshire, a village and suburb in England
 Attenborough railway station
 Attenborough Nature Reserve
 Attenborough Building, University of Leicester, England

Other uses
 The Attenborough Prize, an annual contemporary visual arts prize

See also
 Attenborough in Paradise and Other Personal Voyages, a DVD collection of seven David Attenborough BBC documentary specials
 Attenborough in Paradise (1996), a BBC television nature documentary written and presented by David Attenborough
 Attenborough Cortitch, a Japanese anime character in Gurren Lagann